A cholekinetic drug is a pharmaceutical drug which increases the contractile power of the bile duct.

See also
 Choleretic
 Hydrocholeretic

Drugs